Tammy Nichols (born February 1976) is an American politician serving as a member of the Idaho Senate for District 10.

Early life and education 
Nichols was born in Boise, Idaho and graduated from Boise High School in 1994. In 2016, Nichols graduated from Brigham Young University–Idaho.

Elections 

 In 2018, Nichols defeated four candidates for the open Idaho House of Representatives District 11 Seat B; Kirk Adams, Scott R Brock, David L Lincoln, and Kathryn Ralstin with 38.9% of the vote. Nichols defeated Democratic nominee Brian A. Ertz with 77.6% of the vote.
 In 2020, Nichols defeated Democratic nominee Edward Savala with 79.8% of the vote to retain her seat.
 In 2022, Nichols ran for the state senate in District 10, defeating Democratic nominee Bob Solomon with 77.2% of the vote.

Political activity 
In January 2023, Nichols sponsored SB1038, the Education Choice Act, a school choice bill.

In February 2023, Nichols and Idaho Rep. Judy Boyle introduced HB 154, a bill that would make it a misdemeanor to provide or administer a vaccine developed using messenger RNA (mRNA) technology in any individual or mammal in the state. This would prohibit all mRNA-based COVID-19 vaccines, and pre-emptively ban mRNA vaccines being developed as treatments for other illnesses.  Nichols also sponsored a bill that would require the inclusion of "vaccine materials" in food to be labelled.

Personal life 
Nichols has five children. Nichols and her family live in Middleton, Idaho. Nichols and her husband divorced in January 2019.

References

External links 
 nicholsforidaho.com
 Tammy Nichols at ballotpedia.org
 Tammy Nichols at legislature.idaho.gov

Living people
Republican Party members of the Idaho House of Representatives
Women state legislators in Idaho
21st-century American politicians
21st-century American women politicians
Brigham Young University–Idaho alumni
People from Boise, Idaho
1976 births